Dextrocarpa is a genus of ascidian tunicates in the family Styelidae.

Species within the genus Dextrocarpa include:
 Dextrocarpa misanthropos Monniot, 1978 
 Dextrocarpa solitaris Millar, 1955

References

Stolidobranchia
Tunicate genera